This was the first edition of the tournament.

Ulrikke Eikeri and Elitsa Kostova won the title, defeating Dalma Gálfi and Réka Luca Jani in the final, 2–6, 6–4, [10–8].

Seeds

Draw

Draw

References
Main Draw

NEK Ladies Open - Doubles